Robert Melvin Carpenter (November 6, 1917 – April 18, 1997) was an American basketball player.

He played collegiately for the East Texas State University.

He played for the Fort Wayne Pistons (1949–50, 1950–51) and Tri-Cities Blackhawks (1950–51) in the NBA for 122 games.

External links

1917 births
1997 deaths
American men's basketball players
Fort Wayne Pistons players
Hammond Calumet Buccaneers players
Oshkosh All-Stars players
Texas A&M–Commerce Lions men's basketball players
Tri-Cities Blackhawks players
Centers (basketball)
Power forwards (basketball)